Khasekhemwy (ca. 2690 BC; , also rendered Kha-sekhemui) was the last Pharaoh of the Second Dynasty of Egypt. Little is known about him, other than that he led several significant military campaigns and built the mudbrick fort known as Shunet El Zebib.

His Horus name  can be interpreted  "The Two Powerful Ones Appear", but the name is recorded in many variants, such as 
Ḥr-Ḫꜥj-sḫm(Horus, he whose power appears)",  ḫꜥj sḫm.wj ḫtp nṯrwj jm=f(the two powers appear in that the ancestors rest within him)"(etc.)

Date of reign
Khasekhemwy ruled for close to 18 years, with a floruit in the early 27th century BC. The exact date of his reign in Egyptian chronology is unclear but would fall roughly in between 2690–2670 BC.

According to Toby Wilkinson's study of the Palermo Stone in Royal Annals of Ancient Egypt, this near contemporary 5th dynasty document assigns Khasekhemwy a reign of 17.5 or nearly 18 full years. Wilkinson suggests that a reign of 18 "complete or partial years" can be attributed to Khasekhemwy since the Palermo Stone and its associated fragments record Years 3-6 and Years 12-18 of this king and notes that his final year is recorded in the preserved section of the document. 
Since the cattle count is shown to be regularly biennial during the second dynasty from the Palermo Stone (the year of the 6th, 7th and 8th count is preserved on the document plus full years after these counts respectively), a figure of c. 18 years is likely correct for Khasekhemwy. (or c. 18 years 2 months and 23 days from the main fragment of the Palermo Stone)

Biography 
Khasekhemwy is normally placed as the successor of Seth-Peribsen, though some Egyptologists believe that another Pharaoh, Khasekhem, ruled between them. Most scholars, however, believe Khasekhem and Khasekhemwy are, in fact, the same person. Khasekhem may have changed his name to Khasekhemwy after he reunited Upper and Lower Egypt after a civil war between the followers of the gods Horus and Set. Others believe he defeated the reigning king, Seth-Peribsen, after returning to Egypt from putting down a revolt in Nubia. Either way, he ended the infighting of the Second dynasty and reunited Egypt.

Khasekhemwy is unique in Egyptian history as having both the symbols of Horus and Set on his serekh. Some Egyptologists believe that this was an attempt to unify the two factions; but after his death, Set was dropped from the serekh permanently. He was the earliest Egyptian king known to have built statues of himself.

Khasekhemwy apparently undertook considerable building projects upon the reunification of Egypt. He built in stone at el-Kab, Hierakonpolis, and Abydos. 
He apparently built a unique, as well as huge, tomb at Abydos, the last such royal tomb built in that necropolis (Tomb V). The trapezoidal tomb measures some 70 meters (230 ft) in length and is 17 meters (56 ft) wide at its northern end, and 10 meters (33 ft) wide at its southern end. This area was divided into 58 rooms. Prior to some recent discoveries from the 1st dynasty, its central burial chamber was considered the oldest masonry structure in the world, being built of quarried limestone. Here, the excavators discovered the king's scepter of gold and sard, as well as several beautifully made small stone pots with gold leaf lid coverings, apparently missed by earlier tomb robbers. In fact, Petrie detailed a number of items removed during the excavations of Amélineau. Other items included flint tools, as well as a variety of copper tools and vessels, stone vessels and pottery vessels filled with grain and fruit. There were also small, glazed objects, carnelian beads, model tools, basketwork and a large quantity of seals.

Khasekhemwy built enclosures at Nekhen, and at Abydos (now known as Shunet ez Zebib) and was buried there in the necropolis at Umm el-Qa'ab. He may also have built the Gisr el-Mudir at Saqqara.

An inscription on a stone vase records him “fighting the northern enemy within Nekheb”. This means that Lower Egypt may have invaded and almost taken the capital of Nekhen.

Family 
Khasekhemwy's wife was Queen Nimaathap, mother of the King's Children. They were the parents of Djoser and Djoser's wife Hetephernebti. It is also possible that Khasekhemwy's sons were Sekhemkhet and Sanakhte, the two kings succeeding Djoser.

Nimaathap was a northern princess who he titled “King bearing mother”

Bibliography

Toby Wilkinson, Royal Annals of Ancient Egypt: The Palermo Stone and Its Associated Fragments, (Kegan Paul International), 2000.
Egypt: Khasekhem/Khasekhemwy of Egypt's 2nd dynasty

Notes

References

27th-century BC Pharaohs
27th-century BC deaths
Pharaohs of the Second Dynasty of Egypt
Year of birth unknown